Isfahan is a city in Iran.

Isfahan or Esfahan may also refer to:
Isfahan County, an administrative subdivision of Iran
Isfahan Province, an administrative subdivision of Iran
Esfahan Police Compound in Kohgiluyeh and Boyer-Ahmad Province, Iran
Isfahan rug, a carpet traditionally manufactured in the city of Isfahan
"Isfahan" (song), a Billy Strayhorn composition on Duke Ellington's The Far East Suite
Isfahan (E.S. Posthumus song), a E.S. Posthumus song on the Unearthed album
Ispahan (rose), a kind of rose, based on an older pronunciation of the city's name

See also
Yspahan, a boardgame